Bellbird is an Australian soap opera serial set in a small fictional Victorian rural township of the show's title. The series was produced by the Australian Broadcasting Corporation at its Ripponlea TV studios in Elsternwick, Melbourne. The opening title sequence was filmed at Daylesford, Victoria.
 
Having run for 10 years, from 1967 until 1977, it was the longest-running soap opera/serial ever produced by the ABC. It ended the same year as commercial broadcast series Number 96 and The Box, which had run for six and four years respectively.

Production and broadcasting

The series was screened from 28 August 1967 to 23 December 1977. Although Bellbird was not Australia's first television serial (the first was Network Seven's Autumn Affair), it was the first successful soap opera and even spawned a feature film and tie-in novel. The show's ratings were modest but it had a devoted following, especially in rural Australia. During most of its 10-year production run, 15-minute episodes of Bellbird screened from Monday to Thursday nights, leading in to the 7:00 pm evening news bulletin. In 1976, the series was screened as a single one-hour episode each week, before switching to three half-hour instalments per week during its final season.

Storylines
While the series plots concentrated mainly on small-scale interpersonal, domestic and local relationships, issues and conflicts, there were occasional moments of high drama. One of the most celebrated was the death of the character of the local stock and station agent, Charlie Cousens, played by founding cast member Robin Ramsay. When Ramsay decided to leave the series in 1968, his character was written out in dramatic fashion, with Cousens plunging to his death from the top of a wheat silo. The death scene has figured prominently in retrospectives of great moments in Australian television, and its celebrity meant that it became one of the few segments from the early years of the series that has survived. Other notable 'deaths' across the course of the series included those of local farm girl Hagar Grossark (Barbara Ramsay), who drowned during a local flood, and the tragic 1974 'death' of major character Rhoda Lang (played by founding cast member Lynette Curran) who was killed when her car was struck by a train at a level crossing.

The show's storylines followed the lives of the residents of the small fictional country town that gave the show its title.

Cast 

Bellbird featured a regular cast of 46 actors over its 10 year run (see links, for actor information). 
Principal cast members included:

The National Archives of Australia holds a collection of 43 black and white prints from 1977, identifying over 30 actors involved at that time,

Later shows featuring members of the cast

Prisoner
The cast of Bellbird became household names to the viewing audiences and a number went on to appear in the Network 10 cult series Prisoner. In 1979, two years after Bellbird ended its run, Elspeth Ballantyne, Patsy King and Sheila Florance worked together once again in the iconic series playing guard Meg Jackson Morris (prison governor), Erica Davidson and inmate Lizzie Birdsworth respectively. Ian Smith, Brian James, Anne Lucas, George Mallaby, Lesley Baker, Maggie Millar and Tommy Dysart were others. In later years, Prisoner would star former Bellbird alumni Gerda Nicolson and Maurie Fields as Governor Anne Reynolds and prison officer Len Murphy respectively.

Neighbours

Actor Alan Hopgood would go on to appear in Neighbours as Jack Lassiter. Ian Smith and Anne Charleston, who had also appeared in small roles in Prisoner as Ted Douglas and Lorraine Brooks, went on to appear as long-term and husband and wife characters Harold and Madge Bishop. Whilst Number 96 star Tom Oliver would play long-standing character Lou Carpenter.

International screenings

Episodes of Bellbird were screened in the United Kingdom in 1972. After the initial 52 episodes had been screened, Actors Equity in Australia insisted the ABC increase the price of the episodes so as to pay the actors more. As a result of the price increase, the UK broadcaster purchased no further episodes.

Master tapes

In 2004 it was reported that the ABC taped over the master tapes of the series, something which series cast member Alan Hopgood had complained about in a TV Times article in 1976: "They just wiped [them] off and another episode [was] run over them .... This failure to preserve the program is criminal, to my way of thinking."

Episodes 

An extensive selection of surviving episodes, apparently found during the closure of the ABC's Gore Hill studios, is stored in the National Archives of Australia.

One complete black and white episode is available to be viewed at the Australian Mediatheque at the Australian Centre for the Moving Image in Melbourne, while several colour episodes are known to exist in the hands of private collectors.

Film and novel 
The series was the first soap opera in Australia to spin-off into a feature film version and tie-in novel, entitled Country Town (1971). It focused on Bellbird's problems during a severe drought. Many future soaps followed suit, spawning their own film versions, including Number 96 and The Sullivans.

Ratings

In 1971, Bellbird was the fifteenth most popular show in the country.

See also 
 List of Australian television series
 List of Australian Broadcasting Corporation programs

References

External links 
 Aussie Soap Archive: Bellbird  – Overview and review
 
Bellbird at the National Film & Sound Archive

1967 Australian television series debuts
1977 Australian television series endings
Australian television soap operas
Australian Broadcasting Corporation original programming
Television shows set in Victoria (Australia)
Black-and-white Australian television shows
English-language television shows